Camelina is a genus within the flowering plant family Brassicaceae. The Camelina species, commonly known as false flax, are native to Mediterranean regions of Europe and Asia. Most species of this genus have been little studied, with the exception of Camelina sativa, historically cultivated as an oil plant. Heinrich Johann Nepomuk von Crantz was the first botanist to use the genus Camelina in his classification works in 1762. As a way to reduce fossil fuel emissions, the US Navy tested a 50-50 mix of jet aviation fuel and biofuel derived from camelina seeds in 2010. A study published in December 2016 explained that the current low price of conventional kerosene-based jet fuel makes it cost-prohibitive for commercial airlines to use camelina-based jet fuel. The study said substantial government intervention would be one way to create a market for camelina, by combining 9 percent government subsidy on camelina crop production, with 9 percent tax on the conventional fuel.

Etymology 
The name Camelina comes from the Greek for "ground" and "flax", alluding to its being a weed which suppresses the vigour of flax crops.

Description 
Camelina plants are annual or biennial herbs. Their leaves are simple, lanceolate to narrowly elliptic. The flowers are hermaphroditic actinomorphic, grouped in racemes, and yellowish colored.  The seeds are formed in dehiscent siliques.

Genetics 
The first full genome sequence for Camelina sativa was released on August 1, 2013, by a Canadian research team. The genome sequence and its annotation are available in a genome viewer format and enabled for sequence searching and alignment. Technical details of Camelina's genome sequence were published on April 23, 2014 in the academic journal Nature Communications.

Rothamsted Institute in the UK developed genetically modified Camelina sativa plants that accumulate in their seeds high levels of the longer chain omega-3 oils EPA and DHA, commonly found in fish oils. These plants could provide terrestrial sustainable sources of longer chain omega-3 fatty acids and have benefits for human health and the environment. Field trials were underway in 2016.

Species 
Four common species are presented below. However, at least two databanks indicate more species may exist.
 Camelina alyssum
 Camelina microcarpa
 
 Camelina sativa

Biodiesel 
Biodiesel made from camelina has a variety of benefits. First, traditional petroleum or diesel fuel is not renewable resources, the production of these resources is finite. Camelina biodiesel, however, is a renewable resource. Camelina based aviation fuel could save 84% of carbon emissions. Camelina biodiesel can be produced in large quantities as feedstocks are enough. Moreover, camelina biodiesel can reduce the country's dependence on fossil resources, which can ensure the country's energy security. In addition, camelina biodiesel is an environmentally friendly fuel, and it is biodegradable. Besides, the development of the camelina biodiesel industry can bring employment opportunities. The government has given the industry strong support since camelina biodiesel has a variety of benefits. Therefore, camelina biodiesel has policy support. What's more, the development of the camelina biodiesel industry has brought great economic benefits. According to the investigation, the greenhouse gas emission of camelina biodiesel produced by no-till farming is lower than that of traditional methods.

References 

Biodiesel feedstock sources
Brassicaceae genera
Brassicaceae